Andy Wibowo (born June 9, 1980) is an Indonesian former swimmer, who specialized in butterfly events. He won a bronze medal in the 100 m butterfly (55.59) at the 2007 Southeast Asian Games in Bangkok, Thailand.

Wibowo qualified for the men's 100 m butterfly at the 2004 Summer Olympics in Athens, by posting a FINA B-standard of 55.86 from SEA Games in Hanoi, Vietnam. He challenged seven other swimmers in heat two, including 17-year-old Michal Rubáček of the Czech Republic. He raced to sixth place by nearly two seconds behind winner Rubacek, outside his entry time of 56.86. Wibowo failed to advance into the semifinals, as he placed fifty-fourth overall in the preliminaries.

In 2009, Wibowo embarked on a new career as a triathlete. Since then, he has competed in numerous tournaments across Southeast Asia, including the annual MRA Bali International Triathlon, where he claimed at least two age group titles.

References

External links
NBC Olympics Profile

1980 births
Living people
Indonesian male swimmers
Olympic swimmers of Indonesia
Swimmers at the 2004 Summer Olympics
Male butterfly swimmers
Sportspeople from Bali
Southeast Asian Games medalists in swimming
Southeast Asian Games silver medalists for Indonesia
Southeast Asian Games bronze medalists for Indonesia
Competitors at the 2003 Southeast Asian Games
Competitors at the 2007 Southeast Asian Games
20th-century Indonesian people
21st-century Indonesian people